Loučovice is a municipality and village in Český Krumlov District in the South Bohemian Region of the Czech Republic. It has about 1,500 inhabitants.

Administrative parts
The village of Nové Domky is an administrative part of Loučovice.

Geography

It lies on the Vltava river, in the Bohemian Forest mountains.

Most of the territory lies in the Vyšebrodsko Nature Park. There are several small natural protected areas, the most valuable is the Čertova stěna-Luč National Nature Reserve with giant stones.

History
The first written mention of Loučovice is from 1361, when the village was owned by Vyšší Brod Monastery. The village was burned down in 1420 together with the monastery by Taborites, and renewed after the Thirty Years' War.

Until 1918, the location was part of the Austrian monarchy (Austria side after the compromise of 1867), in the Bohemian district of Kaplice. A post-office was opened in August 1892, under the name Kienberg bei Hohenfurth.

In the 1880s, entrepreneur Arnošt Porák founded a large paper mill in Loučovice, which employed more than 1,000 workers at its peak. Electrified railway built in 1909–1911 reached Loučovice.

During 1938 and 1945 the area became part of Sudetenland. After expulsion of German population in 1945, many smaller hamlets in the area disappeared but Loučovice grew up. In 1950, several villages were merged with Loučovice and created a standalone municipality.

Sights
The Church of Saint Ulrich was built as a late Gothic chapel at the end of the 15th century. After it was destroyed by fire, it was completely rebuilt in the 16th century, and then baroque modified in the 17th century.

References

External links

 

Villages in Český Krumlov District
Bohemian Forest